Euxina is a genus of gastropods belonging to the family Clausiliidae.

The species of this genus are found in Mediterranean, near Black Sea, near Caspian Sea.

Species:

Euxina achrafensis 
Euxina circumdata 
Euxina forcarti 
Euxina gastron 
Euxina hetaera 
Euxina lessonae 
Euxina mazanderanica 
Euxina patrisnemethi 
Euxina persica 
Euxina promta 
Euxina promta 
Euxina talyschana

References

Clausiliidae